Madiea Ghafoor (born 9 September 1992) is a former Dutch female athlete who participated in sprinting and track and field. She mainly competed in the women's 400m sprint, but has also participated in 60m, 100m, 200m and 300m events. She was part of the Netherlands squad at the 2016 Summer Olympics. She is currently (January 2020) detained in Germany, convicted to an 8.5 year jail term for smuggling 50 kilograms of drugs into the country.

Background
Ghafoor was born and raised in Amsterdam. Her interest in athletics began when she was at school aged 13. She trains at the Olympic Stadium in Amsterdam under the coaching of Urta Rozenstruik.

Ghafoor is of Pakistani descent; her parents belong to the Lyari district in Karachi, Sindh, belonging to the dominantly Brahui population of the district. Her grandfather, Lal Baksh Rind, was a senior politician from the brohi community. She became the first female athlete of Rind origin to participate in the Olympic Games.

Career
Ghafoor earned a bronze medal at the 2011 European Athletics Junior Championships in Estonia, coming third in the women's 400m sprint. She has also represented Netherlands in the European Athletics Indoor Championships, reaching up to the semi-finals.

Arrest
On June 18, 2019 Ghafoor was arrested for drug possession during a routine border check near Elten. More than a month later it was reported that the German police had arrested her. In July she was charged with drug smuggling at Kleve district court since 50 kilograms of drugs (crystal meth and ecstasy) had been found in her car. On November 4, 2019, she was convicted by a German court in Kleve and sentenced to an 8 year 6 month jail term. She did not appeal her sentence.

References

1992 births
Dutch female sprinters
Dutch people of Pakistani descent
Dutch people of Baloch descent
Living people
Olympic athletes of the Netherlands
Athletes (track and field) at the 2016 Summer Olympics
Athletes from Amsterdam
Olympic female sprinters
20th-century Dutch women
21st-century Dutch women